Miocaretta is an extinct genus of sea turtle from the Miocene era in what is now Sri Lanka. It was first named by Paul E. P. Deraniyagala in 1967. The type and only species is M. lankae.

References

External links
 Miocaretta at the Paleobiology Database
 Turtles of Sri Lanka

Fossils of India
Cheloniidae
Miocene turtles
Extinct animals of India
Prehistoric turtle genera
Extinct turtles
Monotypic prehistoric reptile genera